Events during the year 1982 in Northern Ireland.

Incumbents
 Secretary of State - Jim Prior

Events
29 January - the well-known loyalist, John McKeague was shot dead in his Belfast shop by the INLA
19 February - The DeLorean Car factory in Belfast is put into receivership.
23 February - Attacks on shipping in Lough Foyle (1981-1982): Glasgow-registered coal ship St. Bedan is bombed and sunk by a Provisional Irish Republican Army unit driving a hijacked pilot boat in Lough Foyle.
6 April - James Prior launches 'rolling devolution' for Northern Ireland.
April 1982 the Thatcher government published its White Paper on Northern Ireland.
10 May - Seamus Mallon of the Social Democratic and Labour Party (SDLP) is appointed to Seanad Éireann.
20 October - Polling takes place in the Northern Ireland Assembly election. Sinn Féin wins its first five seats in the Assembly, with Gerry Adams representing Belfast West (announced 21 October).
27 October
 Three RUC officers are killed by an IRA bomb near Lurgan.
 The Homosexual Offences (Northern Ireland) Order 1982 comes into effect, decriminalising homosexuality in Northern Ireland for those aged 18 or older.
11 November - The killing of three unarmed IRA members at an RUC checkpoint in Craigavon, County Armagh.
24 November - The killing, by an RUC undercover unit, of Michael Tighe and the wounding of his friend Martin McCauley at an IRA arms cache on a farm near Lurgan, County Armagh.
12 December - The killing at an RUC checkpoint in Mullacreavie, County Armagh, of two INLA members, Seamus Grew and Roddy Carroll. The shootings are initially investigated by other members of the RUC, and the Director of Public Prosecutions for Northern Ireland decides to bring prosecutions. At the first trial, Constable John Robinson admits to having been instructed to lie in his statements, and that other witnesses had similarly altered their stories to provide justification for opening fire on Grew and Carroll. When Robinson is found not guilty, the resulting public outcry causes RUC Chief Constable John Hermon to ask John Stalker to investigate the killings. On 5 June 1986, just before Stalker is to make his final report, he is removed from his position in charge of the inquiry.
6 December - Droppin Well bombing: The Irish National Liberation Army kills seventeen people in a bomb attack at the Droppin Well Inn, Ballykelly, County Londonderry.

Arts and literature
22 April - Graham Reid's play The Hidden Curriculum, set in West Belfast, is premiered at the Abbey Theatre, Dublin.
Anne Devlin wins the Hennessy Literary Award for her short story, Passages, which is adapted for television as A Woman Calling.
Medbh McGuckian's poetry collection The Flower Master is published.

Sport

Football
 Football World Cup
Group stage
Northern Ireland 0-0 Yugoslavia
Northern Ireland 1-1 Honduras
Northern Ireland 1-0 Spain
Northern Ireland qualify for the quarterfinals of the World Cup
Second group stage
Northern Ireland 2-2 Austria
Northern Ireland 1-0 France
Northern Ireland are knocked out at the quarter final stage of the World Cup
Irish League
Winners: Linfield

Irish Cup
Winners: Linfield 2 - 1 Coleraine

Motorcycling
 Joey Dunlop wins the Formula One motorcycle world championship for the first time.

Rugby Union
 The Ireland rugby team wins the Triple Crown for the first time since 1949 by beating Scotland 21-12 on 21 February, having already beaten Wales and England.

Snooker
 Alex Higgins wins the World Professional Snooker Championship for the second time.

Births
27 January - Brian Close, footballer.
20 February - Caoimhe Archibald, Sinn Féin MLA.
25 February - Chris Baird, footballer.
2 March - Daithí McKay, Sinn Féin MLA.
11 March - Kyle Anderson, singer (Six).
1 July - Kiera Chaplin, actress and model, granddaughter of Charlie Chaplin.
10 July - Mark Morrison, ice hockey player.
5 October - Rónán Clarke, Gaelic footballer.

Full date unknown
Jamie Dornan, model, musician and actor.
Máire Nic an Bhaird, teacher and Irish language activist.

Deaths
5 February - George Crothers, cricketer (born 1909).
26 March - Sam Kydd, actor (born 1915).
14 August - Patrick Magee, actor (born 1922).
16 November - Lenny Murphy, loyalist paramilitary and leader of the Shankill Butchers (born 1952).

See also
1982 in Scotland
1982 in Wales

References